Jean-Paul Habyarimana (born 17 August 1982) is a Rwandan footballer. He played in three matches for the Rwanda national football team from 2002 to 2004. He was also named in Rwanda's squad for the 2004 African Cup of Nations tournament.

References

1982 births
Living people
Rwandan footballers
Rwanda international footballers
2004 African Cup of Nations players
Place of birth missing (living people)
Association football midfielders